Danish Lutheran Publishing House was the publishing house of the United Evangelical Lutheran Church (ULCA). At the time of the merger of the United Evangelical Lutheran Church with other church bodies to form the "new" American Lutheran Church, Danish Lutheran Publishing House merged with the other publishing houses to form Augsburg Fortress.

Christian publishing companies
Book publishing companies based in Minnesota
Publishing companies established in 1988
Evangelical Lutheran Church in America

References